Farther Along was the third album that Spirit released through Mercury Records, and their eighth album overall. Though Jay Ferguson was missing from the lineup, it is generally considered to be their first "reunion" album.

Out of the four albums that Spirit recorded for Mercury in the mid-70s, this one is the least influenced by Randy California's time in Hawaii. However, it isn't too dissimilar from the previous two albums in that regard, though the song structures are very tight throughout. Consequently, it also bears more than a passing resemblance to Clear at times, probably because of John Locke's presence in the group. It is particularly cherished by fans of that album. The album also includes a notable version of Nature's Way, which is arranged for a chamber orchestra.

Though most of the album was issued on the Mercury Years compilation, much of the material included overdubs which were not part of the original recordings. The 2004 CD reissue of this album (as a two-fer with Son of Spirit) contains the original mixes.

Track listing 
All songs written by Randy California except noted.

Personnel

Spirit 
Mark Andes - bass, vocals
Randy California - bass, guitar, vocals
Ed Cassidy - percussion, drums
John Locke - keyboards
Matt Andes - guitar, vocals

Additional musicians 
Ian Underwood - synthesizer
Ernie Watts - saxophone
Robert Lee - keyboards, vocals
Michael Temple - mandolin
Steve Larrence - percussion
David Blumberg - horn
Nick DeCaro - horn

Production 
Al Schmitt - producer
Bob Hughes - engineer
Jay Kauffman - engineer
Marc Piscitelli - engineer
Allen Sides - engineer

Charts
Album

References 

Spirit (band) albums
1976 albums
albums produced by Al Schmitt
Mercury Records albums